Morton House or Morton Mansion may refer to:

Asher Morton Farmstead, Paris, IL, listed on the NRHP in Illinois
Oliver P. Morton House, Centerville, IN, listed on the NRHP in Indiana
Roberts-Morton House, Newburgh, IN, listed on the NRHP in Indiana
William Morton House, Lexington, KY, listed on the NRHP in Kentucky
Morton-Myer House, Boonville, MO, listed on the NRHP in Missouri
Morton Morton House, Norwood, PA, listed on the NRHP in Pennsylvania
Morton Homestead, Prospect Park, PA, listed on the NRHP in Pennsylvania
Samuel S. Morton House, Franklin, TN, listed on the NRHP in Tennessee
Benjamin Morton House, Knoxville, TN, listed on the NRHP in Tennessee
George W. Morton House, Nolensville, TN, listed on the NRHP in Tennessee
Ritter-Morton House, Spring Hill, TN, listed on the NRHP in Tennessee
Morton House (Ennis, Texas), listed on the NRHP in Texas
Brodhead-Bell-Morton Mansion, Washington, D.C, listed on the NRHP in Washington, D.C.
Morton House (Webster Springs, West Virginia), listed on the NRHP in West Virginia
Cox-Morton House, Charleston, WV, listed on the NRHP in West Virginia
Morton Mansion (Douglas, Wyoming), listed on the NRHP in Wyoming

See also
 Moreton House (disambiguation)